Crystal Bay is a unincorporated community  in Orono, Hennepin County, Minnesota, United States. It is a farming community with many of these hobby farms having been owned by the wealthy of Minneapolis. Crystal Bay has its own post office with ZIP code 55323.

References

Geography of Hennepin County, Minnesota
Neighborhoods in Minnesota